Juan Manuel Hermenegildo de la Luz Olivares (April 4, 1760 – March 1, 1797) was a Venezuelan composer from the Colonial era.

Olivares was born in Caracas.  As a child, he studied under Don Ambrosio Carreño. In 1784, he began teaching in Caracas, and this same year Pedro Ramón Palacios y Sojo entrusted to him the direction of the Academia del Oratorio de San Felipe de Neri, which he held until his death; he also became organist at the academy's church, the Basílica de Santa Teresa.

On May 11, 1789, he married Sebastiana Velásquez in Caracas at the Church of San Pablo Ermitaño, which stood where the Municipal Theater now stands. Padre Sojo was the priest. Olivares was the caretaker and teacher of Lino Gallardo.  He died in El Valle, Caracas.

His Dúo de violines is the only work of chamber music composed in colonial Venezuela which is preserved in its entirety.

Works 
(Incomplete) 
Lamentación primera del Viernes Santo for tenor and orchestra, 1791
Stabat Mater for four voices and instrument, 1791
Dúo de violines Salve Regina for three voices and orchestra
Magnificat with final fugue.El Magníficat y la música de los pardos 
Vísperas de Nuestra Señora de la Merced (motets for two voices)
Psalmes: Dixit Dominus, Beatus Vir, Laudate Dominum

Further reading 
Juan B. Plaza Juan Manuel Olivares. El más Antiguo Compositor Venezolano Separata del No. 63 de la Rev. Nacional de Cultura. Jul-Aug 1947

Venezuelan composers
Male composers
1797 deaths
1760 births
People from Caracas
18th-century composers
18th-century male musicians